Susort is a village in Tysvær municipality in Rogaland county, Norway. The European route E39 highway runs just outside the village. The word is an old version of the word svarttrost which means "blackbird".

For a long time, Susort was a place where people moved away from, until more recently.

References

Villages in Rogaland
Tysvær